Agnes Jongerius (born 4 November 1960) is a Dutch trade unionist and politician who has been a Member of the European Parliament (MEP) for the Netherlands since July 2014. She is a member of the Labour Party, part of the Progressive Alliance of Socialists and Democrats. Between 1987 and 2012 she worked for the Federatie Nederlandse Vakbeweging, a trade union federation. She was chair of the federation between 2005 and 2012.

Career
Jongerius was born in the De Meern neighbourhood in the city of Utrecht in 1960. She went to the Bonifatius Lyceum, a gymnasium in the city of Utrecht between 1973 and 1979. In that latter year she went to Utrecht University to study social-economic history, graduating cum laude in 1988.

One year before her graduation she started working for the Federatie Nederlandse Vakbeweging (FNV). She would work at the FNV until 2012. Serving between 25 May 2005 and 23 June 2012 as chair of the organisation. In 2009 feminist magazine Opzij named Jongerius the most powerful Dutch woman of 2009, citing her role at FNV and the economic crisis.

Political career
In September 2013 information surfaced that Jongerius wanted to become the new mayor of Utrecht, to succeed Aleid Wolfsen. Jongerius did not want to respond to the claims. Jan van Zanen was later named mayor.

Member of the European Parliament, 2014–present
Jongerius occupied the second place on the Labour Party list for the European Parliament elections of 2014, after Paul Tang. She was elected to the European Parliament in May 2014.

In the European Parliament Jongerius is vice-chair of the Committee on Employment and Social Affairs and member of the Delegation for relations with the countries of Southeast Asia and the Association of Southeast Asian Nations (ASEAN).

Following the 2019 elections, Jongerius was part of a cross-party working group in charge of drafting the European Parliament's four-year work program on digitization.

In addition to her committee assignments, Jongerius is a member of the European Parliament Intergroup on Trade Unions, the URBAN Intergroup and the European Parliament Intergroup on LGBT Rights.

Electoral history

References

External links

  Agnes Jongerius at the website of the Labour Party
 Agnes Jongerius at the website of the European Parliament

1960 births
Living people
Dutch trade union leaders
Labour Party (Netherlands) MEPs
MEPs for the Netherlands 2014–2019
MEPs for the Netherlands 2019–2024
21st-century women MEPs for the Netherlands
People from Vleuten-De Meern
Utrecht University alumni